South Bar Lake is located near Empire, Michigan. It is used for recreational purposes, and there is a public swimming beach on the west side of the lake in a village park. The lake contains various fish including bluntnose minnow, largemouth bass, smallmouth bass, yellow perch, Johnny darter, and Iowa darter.

See also
List of lakes in Michigan

References

Lakes of Michigan
Lakes of Leelanau County, Michigan